Palaemon modestus, the Siberian prawn, is a species of freshwater shrimp from eastern Asia. A revision to Palaemon in 2013 moved Palaemon modestus to the Palaemon genus from the Exopalaemon genus.

References

Palaemonidae
Crustaceans described in 1862